The fifth Solheim Cup took place from September 18 to September 20, 1998, at Muirfield Village, Dublin, Ohio, United States. The United States team retained the cup beating the European team by 16 points to 12.

Teams

Europe
Captain
 Pia Nilsson – Sweden
Automatic qualifiers
 Helen Alfredsson – Gothenburg, Sweden
 Laura Davies – Coventry, England
 Marie-Laure de Lorenzi – Biarritz, France
 Alison Nicholas – Gibraltar
 Trish Johnson – Bristol, England
 Catriona Matthew – North Berwick, Scotland
 Annika Sörenstam – Stockholm, Sweden
Captains Picks
 Sophie Gustafson – Särö, Sweden
 Lisa Hackney – England
 Liselotte Neumann – Finspang, Sweden
 Catrin Nilsmark – Gothenburg, Sweden
 Charlotta Sörenstam – Stockholm, Sweden

Captain
Judy Rankin – St Louis, Missouri
Automatic qualifiers
Donna Andrews – Lynchburg, Virginia
Brandie Burton – San Bernardino, California
Tammie Green – Somerset, Ohio
Pat Hurst – San Leandro, California
Juli Inkster – Santa Cruz, California
Christa Johnson – Arcata, California
Kelly Robbins – Mt. Pleasant, Michigan
Betsy King – Reading, Pennsylvania
Meg Mallon – Natick, Massachusetts
Dottie Pepper – Saratoga Springs, New York
Captains Picks
Rosie Jones – Santa Ana, California
Sherri Steinhauer – Madison, Wisconsin

Format
A total of 28 points were available, divided among four periods of team play, followed by one period of singles play. The first period, on Friday morning, was four rounds of foursomes. This was followed in the afternoon by four rounds of fourballs. This schedule was repeated on the Saturday morning and afternoon. The four periods on Friday and Saturday accounted for 16 points. During these team periods, the players played in teams of two. The final 12 points were decided in a round of singles matchplay, in which all 24 players (12 from each team) took part.

Day one
Friday, September 18, 1998

Morning foursomes

Afternoon fourball

Day two
Saturday, September 19, 1998

Morning foursomes

Afternoon fourball

Day three
Sunday, September 20, 1998

Singles

External links
1998 Solheim Cup Match Results

Solheim Cup
Golf in Ohio
Sports competitions in Ohio
Sports in Dublin, Ohio
Solheim Cup
Solheim Cup
Solheim Cup
Solheim Cup